Melica persica is a species of grass that can be found in Central Asia, India, and in Gansu, Jilin, Sichuan provinces of China.

Description
The species is perennial and caespitose with elongated rhizomes. The leaf-sheaths are smooth, tubular and have one closed end. Both leaf-sheaths and leaf-blades have glabrous surface.

Both the upper and lower glumes are oblong, keelless, and are membranous. It palea is 2-veined.

Flowers are fleshy, oblong, truncate, have 2 lodicules and grow together. They have 3 anthers with fruits that are caryopsis. The fruit is also have additional pericarp with a linear hilum.

Ecology
Melica persica grows on grassy hillsides and stony ones too.

References

External links
Melica persica

persica
Flora of Asia